is a Japanese manga written and illustrated by Reiichi Hiiro. It is licensed in North America by Digital Manga Publishing, which released the manga on 9 September 2008.

Reception
Briana Lawrence felt that although the concept was interesting, that the plot was full of coincidences and that the ending was too pat to be satisfying. Leroy Dessaroux felt that the themes of "mental illness and perversion" somehow don't overwhelm the comedy of the work, but rather, add to the "spiciness". Michelle Smith felt the premise was "unique", but that the manga was "mildly diverting", at best.

References

2006 manga
Yaoi anime and manga
Tokuma Shoten manga
Digital Manga Publishing titles